Explocity Pvt Ltd is a media and publishing company headquartered in Bangalore. The company was formed by Ramjee Chandran. Explocity has city based publications across India, New York state and Dubai.

Corporate history
Prior to the inception of Explocity, Chandran first began a Bangalore-based magazine, Bangalore This Fortnight, in 1989. This was followed by the launch of the Bangalore Monthly and the Bangaloremag.com. The internet had just begun its journey in the late 1990s in India, when Chandran created Explocity.com in 1999. Some of the initial funding was from Rupert Murdoch's News Corp. Explocity.com has content includes events, restaurants, hotel listings, shopping, nightlife and sightseeing in cities like New York City, Dubai, Bangalore, Chennai, Hyderabad, Mumbai, New Delhi and Kolkata.

The Explocity guide (formerly known as CityInfo), was the next product from Explocity, which provides information on restaurants, places to visit, shopping, in cities around the world. It then began publishing lifestyle magazines like 080 (Bangalore), 044 (Chennai) and 040 (Hyderabad), followed by 022 (Mumbai) and 011 (Delhi'). A daily newsletter, MyTime, was also created. Explocity was one of the first companies in the world to introduce the software called Pagician for their digital magazines. Explocity also launched a city Movies Guide website online called Explocity Movies. Explocity also partners with Kingfisher (beer) to bring out the Kingfisher Explocity Great Food and Nightlife Guides.

Products and events
Explocity's weekend dining newsletter FirstFoodie was written about in IMPACT magazine's story about media houses in India that cater to food and beverages in January 2013.

Explocity launched EXEC (now known as Executive Traveller) - reportedly, India's first magazine for business travellers - in April 2010. A couple of years later, EXEC tied up with a smartphone content provider to serve its content on the iPhone, iPad and Android smartphones and tablet devices.

Of recent times, Explocity has been under the active management of Sol Mooney Media, a venture started by Explocity founder Ramjee Chandran.

Explocity, in 2022, started Explocity Podcasts. The Literary City with Ramjee Chandran is a light and funny podcast about words.

In April 2022, Explocity re-launched BangaloreMag and Explocity Bangalore Guide in digital form.

References 
Article about Kingfisher partnering with Explocity for the Kingfisher Explocity Great Food and Nightlife Guides
Article in the Telegraph India about Explocity's involvement in the Foodguide business
Article that quotes Ramjee Chandran on listings as a revenue stream for portals
Explocity on Wikimapia
Explocity Launches 044 Magazine for Chennai
An old article in The Hindu about Explocity
An article that cites Ramjee Chandran, CEO of Explocity as one of the key people of Indian media
About the Kingfisher Explocity Great Food Guide
Explocity appoints Allen Mendonca as Editorial Director
Explocity listed as one of India's favourite websites

Notes

External links 
Explocity website
Executive Traveller Magazine
Sol Mooney Media website

Publishing companies established in 1989
Publishing companies of India
Mass media companies of India
Online companies of India
Companies based in Bangalore
1989 establishments in Karnataka